Philipse Manor may refer to:

Philipsburg Manor, the Philipse family manor in Westchester and Bronx Counties, New York, originally known as Philipsborough Manor, and also known as Philipse Manor
Philipse Manor Hall State Historic Site, the former family seat of Philipse Manor, now a house museum in Yonkers, New York
Philipsburg Manor House, a reconstructed grist mill and trading site in Sleepy Hollow, New York, serving as an interpretive museum for Philipse Manor

It may also refer to:
Philipse Manor (Metro-North station), a stop on the Hudson Line of the Metro-North Railroad
 Philipse Manor, a subdivision of Sleepy Hollow, New York immediately adjacent to the Metro-North station

Also related are:
The Philipse Patent, a Royal land grant of the Philipse family, seized during the American Revolution and comprising today's Putnam County, New York
The Philipsburgh Building, a Beaux-Arts architectural landmark building in Getty Square in Yonkers, New York